The 1982 United States Senate election in Rhode Island took place on November 2, 1982. Incumbent Republican Senator John Chafee successfully sought re-election to a second term, defeating Democrat Julius C. Michaelson.

Republican primary

Candidates 
John Chafee

Democratic primary

Candidates 
Julius C. Michaelson, former Attorney General of Rhode Island
Helen E. Flynn

Results

General election

Results

See also 
 1982 United States Senate elections

References

External links 

Rhode Island
1982
1982 Rhode Island elections